Sadie Plant (born Sarah Jane Plant; 16 March 1964 in Birmingham, England) is a British philosopher, cultural theorist, and author.

Education 
She earned her PhD in Philosophy from the University of Manchester in 1989 and subsequently taught at the University of Birmingham's Department of Cultural Studies (formerly the Centre for Contemporary Cultural Studies) before going on to found the Cybernetic Culture Research Unit with colleague Nick Land at the University of Warwick, where she was a faculty member. Her original research was related to the Situationist International before turning to the social and political potential of cyber-technology. Her writing in the 1990s would prove influential in the development of cyberfeminism.

Career 

Sadie Plant left the University of Warwick in 1997 to write full-time. She published a cultural history of drug use and control, and a report on the social effects of mobile phones, as well as articles in publications as varied as the Financial Times, Wired, Blueprint, and Dazed and Confused. She published the book Zeros + Ones in 1997, in which she reveals how women's role in programming has been overlooked. She was interviewed as one of the 'People to Watch' in the Winter 2000–2001 issue of Time.

Publications
The Most Radical Gesture: The Situationist International in a Postmodern Age (1992, Routledge)  
Zeroes + Ones : Digital Women and the New Technoculture (1997, Doubleday) 
Writing on Drugs (1999, Faber and Faber)

References

General references
 The Independent
 The Independent
 http://www.faber.co.uk/author/sadie-plant/
 http://www2.tate.org.uk/intermediaart/entry15419.shtm
 http://www.v2.nl/archive/people/sadie-plant
 https://web.archive.org/web/20120308043525/http://www.rigb.org/contentControl?action=displayContent&id=00000001211
 http://future-nonstop.org/c/bb37122bc11c3dd0787d5205d9debc41
 http://www.ephemerajournal.org/sites/default/files/3-1plantandland.pdf

External links
A short biography of Sadie Plant
Zero News Datapool: Sadie Plant – outdated site with several article links
 – essay by Sadie Plant commissioned by Motorola.
 – text-only version of above, formatted for US Letter paper.
Sadie Plant, http://future-nonstop.org/c/cee09dd059c37acc692ef6ba19465afb talking in Vienna on systems, technology and gender], 1996
Interview with Sadie Plant, Getting With The Program, Chicago Tribune, 3 November 1996 

1964 births
Living people
British women writers
British writers
People educated at Alcester Grammar School
People from Birmingham, West Midlands
Academics of the University of Warwick
Academics of the University of Birmingham
Accelerationism